The Alabama Railroad  was a class III railroad as reported by the Association of American Railroads. The ALAB was owned and operated by Alabama Railroad LLC. The railroad operated  of railroad from Flomaton, Alabama to Peterman, Alabama.

On April 18, 2019, the railroad filed to abandon its entire line. In 2020, the line was purchased intact by Alabama Railroad LLC who filed on July 6, 2022 to abandon the entire line.

History

The route of the Alabama Railroad was originally constructed over several years (between 1880 and 1901) as the Pensacola & Selma Railroad and quickly became a part of the Louisville & Nashville Railroad network. The original line proceeded north from Corduroy, Alabama, to Selma, Alabama. That portion of the line was abandoned by the Seaboard System prior to the merger with CSX in 1986.  There was also a L&N branch that went to Camden from a junction just northeast of Corduroy that was abandoned prior to the merger into the Seaboard System in 1986. The remainder of the line north of Peterman, Alabama, was abandoned in approximately 1994 to include an 800+ foot tunnel built in 1899 located at Tunnel Springs, Alabama. The ALAB connected with CSX Transportation at Flomaton, Alabama. The railroad served three industries located in Monroeville, Alabama, and stores railcars for other railroads. The ALAB serves Temple Inland with outbound shipments of particle board and veneer, a cement powder transload operated by Gate Precast, and Harrigan Lumber after its re-opening in 2010. The railroad operated three EMD GP20 locomotives on a bi-weekly basis. The Alabama Railroad had several bridges and trestles found to be deficient in late 2016, and subsequently the railroad has had an embargo placed on loaded freight cars. Many empty surplus oil tank cars were placed into storage on the ALAB's tracks and the storage fees composed much of the company's revenue. Tracks through the Tunnel Hill tunnel and northwards have been removed.

Route
The Alabama Railroad operated  of railroad from Flomaton to Peterman.

See also 

 Pioneer Railcorp

References

External links
 

Alabama railroads
Switching and terminal railroads
Spin-offs of CSX Transportation
Pioneer Lines
Railway companies established in 1991
1991 establishments in Alabama